Left Socialist Party may refer to:

Left Socialist Party (Belgium)
Left Socialist Party (Sweden)
Left Socialist Party (Tunisia)
Left Socialist Party of Japan
Left Socialists (Denmark)
Left Socialist-Revolutionaries, a party in Russia

See also
Socialist Party (disambiguation)
Socialist Left Party (disambiguation)